Hex Sheets is a supplement for fantasy role-playing games published by Games Workshop in 1978.

Contents
Hex Sheets is a GM's aid: hexagonal mapping paper for designing wilderness terrain. It is also for use with AD&D.

Publication history
Hex Sheets was published by Games Workshop in 1978 as a 50-sheet pad.

As Games Workshop expanded its publishing arm beyond White Dwarf and reprints of American products. among their first original products were a pad of character sheets (1978), a pad of hex sheets (1978), and the Dungeon Floor Plans (1979) gaming accessory, each of which carried the Dungeons & Dragons trademark, and were some of the few licensed D&D products ever authorized by TSR.

Games Workshop later produced a set of Wilderness Hex Sheets in 1982, as an A4 pad of 50 sheets with 6mm hexes.

Reception
Doug Cowie reviewed Wilderness Hex Sheets for Imagine magazine, and stated that "They are well produced and, given the proven usefulness of these aids, they should be helpful to any referee. My only reservation is with the price. They are about 30% dearer than similar sheets available 'loose' (i.e. not in pads). The only substantial difference is the superior packaging of the Games Workshop product."

Reviews
 The Space Gamer #50 (April, 1982)

References

Fantasy role-playing game supplements
Role-playing game mapping aids
Role-playing game supplements introduced in 1978